Events from the year 1886 in art.

Events
 March – Vincent van Gogh moves to Paris.
 April – New English Art Club mounts its first exhibition, at the Egyptian Hall, London, providing an alternative to the Royal Academy for younger artists, such as Philip Wilson Steer, under the influence of Paris.
 April 28 – Paul Cézanne marries his model and former lover Marie-Hortense Fiquet, despite having publicly stated that he has no feelings for her.
 May 15–June 15 – Eighth and last collective Impressionist exhibition in Paris at 1 rue Laffitte introduces Georges Seurat's A Sunday Afternoon on the Island of La Grande Jatte among other early examples of pontillism exhibited separately.
 June 30 – Royal Holloway College for women, established by patent medicine manufacturer Thomas Holloway (died 1883), opened by Queen Victoria at Egham in Surrey, England, incorporating a picture gallery for which the founder has acquired a collection of predominantly modern British works; this is the first art gallery in Britain intended primarily for viewing by women.
 July – Paul Gauguin joins the Pont-Aven School of artists for the summer.
 August 21–September 21 – Second exhibition by the Société des Artistes Indépendants in Paris. Henri Rousseau exhibits for the first time and Seurat's A Sunday Afternoon on the Island of La Grande Jatte causes the critic Félix Fénéon to describe the technique of pointillism and chromoluminarist style being developed by Seurat and Paul Signac as neo-impressionism.
 October 28 – Dedication of Frédéric Auguste Bartholdi's Statue of Liberty in New York Harbor.
 P. H. Emerson publishes his first photographic book, Life and Landscape on the Norfolk Broads.
 Publication in French of Irish-born writer George Moore's autobiographical novel Confessions of a Young Man describing bohemian life in 1870s Paris among the Impressionists.
 Publication of Émile Zola's novel L'Œuvre based on his friendship with Paul Cézanne.

Awards
 Prix de Rome (painting) – Charles Lebayle, Claudius Proclaimed Emperor

Works

 Ivan Aivazovsky – Storm
 Lawrence Alma-Tadema – The Apodyterium
 William Bliss Baker
 Fallen Monarchs
 Under the Apple-Trees
 Emmanuel Benner – Mary Magdalene in the Desert
 Anna Bilińska – At the Seashore
 Frederick Brown – Hard Times
 Alexander Calandrelli – Equestrian statue of Frederick William IV (Berlin)
 Gustaf Cederström
 The Baptists
 The Salvation Army
 William Merritt Chase – Hattie
 Emmeline Deane – Anna Bilińska
 Edgar Degas
 The Tub (Musée d'Orsay, Paris)
 Woman in the Bath (Hill-Stead Museum, Farmington, Connecticut)
 Lowes Cato Dickinson – The Lawn at Goodwood
 Alexander Doyle – Statue of Benjamin Harvey Hill
 Albert Dubois-Pillet
 The Banks of the Seine at Neuilly
 Three barges moored alongside an industrial town
 Paul Gauguin – Still Life with Profile of Laval
 Nikolai Ge – Sophia and Alexandra Tolstoya
 Jean-Léon Gérôme – Bonaparte Before the Sphinx
James Gowans and John Stevenson Rhind – Brass Founders' Pillar
 James Guthrie – In the Orchard
 Margaret Bernadine Hall – Fantine
 Vilhelm Hammershøi – Frederikke Hammershøi, the artist's mother
 Winslow Homer – Eight Bells
 Pierre-Georges Jeanniot – La ligne de feu, 16 août 1870
 Fernand Khnopff – The Garden
 Benjamin Williams Leader – Evening After Rain, Worcestershire
 Alexander Litovchenko – Tsar Alexis and Archbishop Nikon Venerating the Relics of Patriarch Philip
 Claude Monet
 The Manneporte at Étretat
 The Port Coton Pyramids
 Study of a Figure Outdoors: Woman with a Parasol, facing left
 Albert Joseph Moore – Silver
 Henry Moore – Mount's Bay
 Edvard Munch – The Sick Child
 Edward Poynter – Mary, Countess of Wemyss
 Jean-François Raffaëlli – At the Caster's
 Cristóbal Rojas – La miseria
 John Singer Sargent
 Carnation, Lily, Lily, Rose
 Millet's Garden
 Georges Seurat – A Sunday Afternoon on the Island of La Grande Jatte – 1884 (Art Institute of Chicago)
 Henryk Siemiradzki – Christ with Martha and Mary
 Solomon Joseph Solomon – Ajax and Cassandra
 Vincent van Gogh
 Le Moulin de la Galette (series)
 Skull of a Skeleton with Burning Cigarette (approximate date)
 Vase with Poppies
 Georg von Rosen – Nils Adolf Erik Nordenskiöld with the Vega
 George Frederick Watts – Hope
 Anders Zorn – Sommarnöje

Births
 January – René Beeh, German painter and draughtsman from Alsace (died 1922)
 March 1 – Oskar Kokoschka, Austrian artist, poet and playwright (died 1980)
 March 15 – Gerda Wegener, Danish artist (died 1940)
 April 19 – Hermine David, French painter (died 1970)
 June 14 – Archibald Nicoll, New Zealand painter (died 1953)
 September 1 – Tarsila do Amaral, Brazilian modernist artist (died 1973)
 September 16 – Jean Arp, Alsatian artist and writer (died 1966)
 October 17 – Andrej Bicenko, Russian fresco painter and muralist (died 1973)
 December 8 – Diego Rivera, Mexican painter and muralist (died 1957)
December 15 – Jean Paul Slusser, painter, designer, art critic, professor, and director of the University of Michigan Museum of Art (died 1981)
 Viktor Jansson, Finnish sculptor (died 1958)
 Duncan Phillips, American art collector and critic (died 1966)

Deaths
 January 7 – Richard Dadd, painter (born 1817)
 April 16 – Andrew Nicholl, Irish painter (born 1804)
 May 19 – Arthur Quartley – American painter (born 1839)
 June 29 – Adolphe Joseph Thomas Monticelli, French painter (born 1824)
 July 21 – Karl von Piloty, painter (born 1826)
 August 25 – Charles Callahan Perkins, art critic and author (born 1823)
 September 17 – Asher Brown Durand, painter of the Hudson River School (born 1796)
 September 23 – Thomas Webster, painter (born 1800)
 November 20 – William Bliss Baker, American painter (born 1859)

References

 
Years of the 19th century in art
1880s in art